This is a list of spaceflights launched between October and December 1962. For launches in the rest of the year, see 1962 in spaceflight (January–March), 1962 in spaceflight (April–June) and 1962 in spaceflight (July–September). For an overview of the whole year, see 1962 in spaceflight.

Launches

|colspan=8 style="background:white;"|

October
|-

|colspan=8 style="background:white;"|

November
|-

|colspan=8 style="background:white;"|

December
|-

|}

References

10
1962 in spaceflight 10